This table shows medal results for football at the 2005 Summer Universiade.

Universiade
2005 Summer Universiade
2005
Universiade 2005
Universiade